"The Best Is Yet to Come" is a song written in 1959 by Cy Coleman, and generally associated with Frank Sinatra

The Best Is Yet to Come may also refer to:

Music

Albums
The Best Is Yet to Come (Ella Fitzgerald album), 1982
The Best Is Yet to Come (Grover Washington Jr. album), 1982
 The Best Is Yet to Come, 2000 album by Shannon
 The Best Is Yet to Come, 2003 album by Martha Munizzi
 The Best Is Yet to Come, 2011 album by Laura Fygi
 The Best Is Yet to Come, 2021 album by Bonnie Tyler

Songs
"The Best Is Yet to Come" (Clifford T. Ward song), 1981
"The Best Is Yet to Come", a 1987 song by Samantha Fox from the album Samantha Fox
"The Best Is Yet to Come" (Grover Washington Jr. song), 1982
"The Best Is Yet to Come", a 1998 song on the Metal Gear Solid Original Game Soundtrack
"The Best Is Yet to Come" (Donald Lawrence song), 2002
"The Best Is Yet to Come", a song by Kids In Glass Houses from the 2010 album Dirt
"The Best Is Yet to Come", a song by Scorpions from the 2010 album Sting in the Tail
"The Best Is Yet to Come", a song by Anneke van Giersbergen from the 2013 album Drive
"The Best Is Yet to Come", a song by Sheppard from the 2014 album Bombs Away
"The Best Is Yet to Come", a song by Mike + The Mechanics from the 2017 album Let Me Fly

Other uses
The Best Is Yet to Come (film), a 1951 film on cancer
The Best Is Yet to Come (Le meilleur reste à venir), a 2019 French dramedy film
 The Best Is Yet to Come: Coping with Divorce and Enjoying Life Again, by Ivana Trump 1995
 The Best is Yet to Come, a book on economics by Marc Coleman 2007

See also
 "Best Is Yet to Come", a song by Red